A Short View of Legal Bibliography is a book by Richard W. Bridgman. It was first published in 1807. 

In 1835, David Hoffman said this book was "wholly unworthy of the subject".

In 1847, John Gage Marvin said:

In 1988, Bookman's Yearbook said that the fact that this book was still in use indicated "the sorry state" that legal bibliography was in, the book being "like a third class Lowndes or Brunet".

The Harvard Law Review said, in relation to Year-Book bibliography, that Brigdman's Legal Bibliography discloses little that is valuable and its accuracy does not stand the test of verification.

References
A Short View of Legal Bibliography, containing some Critical Observations of the Authority of the Reporters and other Law Writers, collected from the best authorities, and intended as a Companion to the author's Reflections on the Study of the Law. To which is added, A Plan for Classifying a Public or Private Library. 8vo. W Reed. London. 1807. Digitised copy from Google Books.

Legal bibliographies
1807 non-fiction books